The Benedictine monastery in Abu Ghosh (St Mary of the Resurrection Abbey) is a monastery run by the Olivetan Benedictine order in Abu Ghosh, Israel.

It is built on the foundations of the Crusader Church of the Resurrection, or Church of our Lord's Resurrection, It was established  in the 12th century on top of Roman ruins in the center of Abu Ghosh, known by the Crusaders as Fontenoid. Until the 19th century, the Arabs called it Qaryet al-'Inab. The site was associated with Emmaus from the Gospel of Luke.

France claims ownership of the land under the Ottoman capitulations and says this was formalised by the Fischer-Chauvel Agreement of 1948, which has not been ratified by Israel.

History

The late Romanesque/early Gothic-style church was built by the Hospitallers in 1140. It was acquired by the French government in 1899 and placed under guardianship of the French Benedictine Fathers. Edward Robinson (1838) described it as “obviously from the time of the crusades, and [...] more perfectly preserved than any other ancient church in Palestine.” Excavations carried out in 1944 confirm that the Crusaders identified the site as the biblical Emmaus. The church is built over an ancient spring.

From 1956, the monastery was run by the Lazarist Fathers.

Today a double monastery of nuns and priests worship in the church and offer hospitality, commemorating the New Testament story of the couple on the Jerusalem–Emmaus road.

See also
Christianity in Israel

References

External links 
 
Video of the History and presentation of the benedictine community in Abu Gosh   with subtitles in English.

Abu Ghosh Benedictine
Abu Ghosh
Church buildings in the Kingdom of Jerusalem
Church buildings of the Knights Hospitaller
Buildings and structures in Abu Ghosh
Overseas France